Sayram may refer to:

Places
Sayram (city), city in South Kazakhstan Province, Kazakhstan
Sayram District, district of South Kazakhstan Province, Kazakhstan
Sayram Lake, in Bortala Mongol Autonomous Prefecture, Xinjiang, China
, town in Baicheng County, Xinjiang, China 
Sayran Lake, an urban lake in the western part of Almaty, Kazakhstan

People
Hüseyin Sayram (1905–1988), Turkish politician